The Fear of 13 is a 2015 British documentary film by David Sington. It tells the story of Nick Yarris, who was convicted and sentenced to capital punishment for a 1981 kidnapping, rape and murder, and spent 22 years on death row in Pennsylvania. Yarris was released in 2004 when DNA evidence established his innocence.

Synopsis

Nick Yarris tells his life story, in the style of a one-man show. In a non-linear structure provided by Sington's editing, Yarris reveals his early life, youthful transgressions, arrest, and time on death row, with several twists and turns. No one else appears on screen. Supplementary archival footage, some original animation, and sound effects are occasionally included as Yarris describes events.

Reception

The Fear of 13 premiered at the 2015 London Film Festival, where it was nominated for Best Documentary Film. On Rotten Tomatoes the film has an approval rating of 94% based on reviews from 16 critics, with an average rating of 7.38/10.

Time Out ranked it with four stars out of five, with the summary "This death row documentary sets up an intriguing mystery that'll keep you gripped until the final moments". The Times also gave it four stars, and praised Yarris's storytelling skills: "The Fear of 13 is riveting and that’s mainly due to its extraordinary subject". Mark Kermode awarded the film three stars, and summarised its themes by writing "Yarris leads us on a labyrinthine journey that has as much to say about the art of storytelling as it does about the iniquities of crime and punishment."

References

External links
 
 Director's website
 
 Freely available for viewing on WatchDocumentaries.com

British documentary films
Documentary films about crime in the United States
Biographical documentary films
2015 documentary films
2010s English-language films
2010s British films